David Mota (born 13 October 1985) is a Spanish rugby union player for Complutense Cisneros. Formerly he was a player of rugby league for the Crusaders for the CRC Madrid and for the CR Liceo Francés.
His position of choice is at centre/wing.

He also played for Gatos de Madrid, one of the franchises of the competition called Superibérica de Rugby.

He has played for the Spain national rugby union team since 20 November 2004 when he has made his début against Hungary. Since then, he has played 25 games and has scored 40 points (8 tries). He also has played with Spain the European Nations Cup.

Honours
CRC Madrid
 División de Honor de Rugby: 2008-09
 Copa del Rey de Rugby: 2008-09

Gatos de Madrid
 Superibérica de Rugby: 2009

References

1985 births
Spanish rugby league players
Crusaders Rugby League players
Spanish rugby union players
Living people
Spain international rugby union players
Rugby union centres
Spanish expatriate rugby league players
Expatriate rugby league players in Wales
Spanish expatriates in Wales
Sportspeople from Madrid
Rugby union players from the Community of Madrid